Kertomesis oxycryptis is a moth in the family Autostichidae. It was described by Edward Meyrick in 1929. It is found in India.

The wingspan is about 11 mm. The forewings are dark fuscous. The stigmata form cloudy blackish spots, the plical rather obliquely before the first discal, a small blackish spot on the dorsum obliquely before the second discal. The hindwings are grey.

References

Moths described in 1929
Kertomesis
Taxa named by Edward Meyrick